Sangeet Natak Akademi Tagore Ratna and Sangeet Natak Akademi Tagore Puraskar were given at special events organised by Sangeet Natak Akademi in 
Kolkata – Sangeet Natak Akademi Tagore Samman on 25 April 2012 
Chennai – Sangeet Natak Akademi Tagore Samman on 2 May 2012.

Sangeet Natak Akademi Tagore Ratna is equivalent to Sangeet Natak Akademi Fellowship and Sangeet Natak Akademi Tagore Puruskar is equivalent to Sangeet Natak Akademi Award. These were one time awards conferred on the occasion to commemorate 150 birthday of Rabindranath Tagore

Sangeet Natak Akademi Tagore Ratna Recipients

Music
Laxman Krishnarao Pandit
Zia Fariduddin Dagar
Ghulam Mustafa Khan 
Prabha Atre
Vanraj Bhatia
Abdul Halim Jaffer Khan
Ram Narayan
Sabri Khan
Buddhadev Das Gupta
Nedunuri Krishna Murthy
Sripada Pinakapani
R. K. Sreekanthan
M.S. Gopalakrishnan
Natesan Ramani
Vellore G. Ramabhadran
Guruvayur Dorai
Kartar Singh

Dance
Vyjayantimala Bali
Kalanidhi Narayanan
M. K. Saroja
Kumudini Lakhia
Mayadhar Raut
Mankompu Sivasankara Pillai
Pasumarthy Venugapala Krishna Sarma
Maya Rao
Amala Shankar
P.K. Narayanan Nambiar

Theatre
Mohit Chattopadhyaya
Satya Dev Dubey
Vijaya Mehta
Rajinder Nath
Rudraprasad Sengupta
Alyque Padamsee
Soumitra Chatterjee
R. Nagarathnamma
V. Ramamurthy

Traditional/Folk/Tribal/Dance/Music/Theatre and Puppetry
Satguru Jagjit Singh Namdhari
Gurcharan Singh Ragi
Kartar Singh
Yamunabai Waikar
Lalit Chandra Ojha
Arghya Sen
G Gourakishore Sharma
T. R. Kamala Murthy
Birendranath Datta
Sonam Tshering Lepcha

Overall Contribution/Scholarship
B. Rajanikanta Rao
Laxmi Narayan Garg
B. N. Goswamy
M. Nagabhushana Sarma
P. V. Krishnamurthy

Sangeet Natak Akademi Tagore Puruskar recipients

Music
Shankar Lal Mishra - Hindustani
Sunanda Patnaik - Hindustani
Ganesh Prasad Sharma -	Hindustani
Amiya Ranjan Banerjee - Hindustani
Shrikrishna Savlaram Haldankar - Hindustani
Faiyaz Khan - Hindustani Instrumental
Tanjavur Sankara Iyer - Carnatic
R Visweswaran	- Carnatic Instrumental
Mayavaram Saraswathi -	Carnatic Instrumental
KumarPillai Velukutty Nair - Carnatic Instrumental
K. Chellaiah - Carnatic Instrumental
S.R.G. Rajanna	- Carnatic Instrumental
Karam Chaoba Singh - Other Major Traditions of Music

Dance
S. Swaminathan - Bharatnatyam
N.S. Jayalakshmi - Bharatnatyam
Rajee Narayan - Bharatnatyam
Chemencerri Kuniraman Nair - Kathakali
Nattuvan Paramasiva Menon - Kathakali
Devjani Chaliha - Manipuri
Bhagavatula Yagna Narayan Sarma - Kuchipudi
Ritha Devi Mukhopadhyaya - Odissi
Haricharan Saikia - Sattriya
Patraayani Sangeetha Rao - Music for Dance
Bhagavatula Seetarama Sarma - Music for Dance

Theatre
Bijoy Kumar Mishra
K. M. Raghavan Nambiar
Madhukar Toradmal
Jalabala Vaidya & Gopal Sharman (Joint Award)
Prasad Sawkar
Chatla Sreeramulu
Sushma Seth
Jayamala Jayaram Shiledar

Traditional/Folk/Tribal/Dance/Music/Theatre and Puppetry
Ali Mohamad Bhagat
Zahoor Mir
Sumitra Sen
Mahipatray Kavi
Hira Lal Yadav
Abungbam Kabui
Bishwa Bandhu
Ramsahaya Pandey
Radha Krishna Kadam
Gambhari Devi
Sademmeren Longkumer 
Anusuya Devi
Gopiram Borgayan

Overall Contribution/Scholarship
M. L. Varadpande
B M Sundaram
Ramchandra Chintaman Dhere
Raja Mrigendra SIngh
Nilamadhab Panigrahi

References

Awards established in 2011
Civil awards and decorations of India
Indian film awards
Indian music awards
Indian art awards
Dance awards
Sangeet Natak Akademi